The Presumpscot formation is a late Pleistocene glacial deposit of predominantly submarine clays, located along the Maine and New Hampshire coast and inland along their major river valleys. It is named after the Presumpscot River where large amounts of the characteristic blue-gray clay are found.

Fossilized remains of marine organisms are found interspersed among the deposits.

It was a historically significant resource for the production of brick, though little of that industry remains.

Pollen found in the clays near Portland, Maine, indicate spruce forests, with low proportions of pines, about 11500 BP.

References 

Barker, 2011, Glacial-marine deposits of southern Maine.
Thompson, W., and H. Borns,. 1985. "Surficial geologic map of Maine." Augusta, ME: Maine Geological Survey, 1:500,000.

External links 
Maine Geological Survey

Geologic formations of Maine
Geologic formations of New Hampshire